The 2022 Robert Morris Colonials football team represented the Robert Morris University during the 2022 NCAA Division I FCS football season. Led by fifth-year head coach Bernard Clark, the Colonials played their home games at the Joe Walton Stadium in Moon Township, Pennsylvania.

Previous season

The Colonels finished the 2021 season with a record of 4–6, 3–5 Big South play to finish in seventh place.

Schedule

Schedule Source:

Game summaries

Dayton

at Miami (OH)

East Tennessee State

at Delaware State

Gardner–Webb

at Campbell

North Carolina A&T

at Appalachian State

at Charleston Southern

at Murray State

Bryant

References

Robert Morris
Robert Morris Colonials football seasons
College football winless seasons
Robert Morris Colonials football